Bojan Vujić (born 6 June 1974) is a Bosnian diplomat and former professional tennis player.

As a tennis player, he competed in the Davis Cup for both the Federal Republic of Yugoslavia (1995–1997) and Bosnia and Herzegovina (2004–2006). Vujić reached a career high singles ranking of 275 on the professional tour.

On 16 September 2019, he began serving as Ambassador of Bosnia and Herzegovina to the United States.

See also
List of Yugoslavia Davis Cup team representatives

References

External links

1974 births
Living people
Serbia and Montenegro male tennis players
Bosnia and Herzegovina male tennis players
Bosnia and Herzegovina diplomats
Ambassadors of Bosnia and Herzegovina to the United States
Serbs of Bosnia and Herzegovina